, born , was a Japanese film actor. He appeared in more than seventy films from 1925 to 1959.

Career
Born in Tokyo, Himori entered the Shochiku studios in 1924 and, after starting out in side roles, became a leading player, particularly specializing in realistic films after the coming of sound. With his starring role in Yasujirō Ozu's The Only Son as the best example, he was often featured in films by famous directors for his earnest acting that smelled of reality. He became a by player after the war, but died of a heart attack in 1959. Shochiku honored him with a company funeral.

Selected filmography

References

External links
 

1907 births
1959 deaths
People from Tokyo
Japanese male silent film actors
20th-century Japanese male actors